Vassily Grigorievich Voskresensky (16 September 1888 – 27 July 1951), usually referred to as Colonel Wassily de Basil, was a Russian ballet impresario.

De Basil was born in Kaunas, Lithuania, in 1888 (his year of birth is given alternately as 1880 or 1886). He retired from the Russian Imperial Army as a colonel in the Cossack army, fighting in Baku against the Turkish and German forces and was awarded the Order of St. George by his General, Lazar Fedorovich Bicherakhov, himself referred to as the "last soldier of the Empire" by writer, Vlad Olgin. Basil was demobilised from the army in 1919 and worked as a truck driver in Paris before launching himself as a ballet impresario with his first small ballet touring company in 1921. Hiving off the success of Diaghilev, by 1923 Wassily was doing well enough to hire Olga Smimova and Nikolay Tripolitov as his principal dancers on small tours in France, Germany, Switzerland and Austria.

It was at this point he adopted a "stage name" Wassily de Basil (essentially Basil de Basil) in 1923 and gave the name of his troupe as Ballet Russe directed by W. de Basil.

Following the death of Sergei Diaghilev in 1929, the members of his Ballets Russes went in many directions. Around 1925, de Basil partnered with Alexey Tsereteli (also Zereteli) and Ignaty Zon to form the artists agency called Zerbason. In 1929–1930 de Basil's ballet troupe acted together with Tsereteli's opera troupe. De Basil, Tseretelli and Michel Kachouk, the manager of Feodor Chaliapin, became directors of the Opéra Russe à Paris, a company originally formed by soprano Maria Kousnetsova (also Maria Kuznetsova).

De Basil and René Blum, ballet director at the Monte Carlo Opera, along with financier Serge Denham, founded the Ballets Russes de Monte-Carlo in 1931. The ballet gave its first performance in Monte Carlo on January 11, 1932- the national holiday of Monte Carlo.

Blum and de Basil did not agree artistically, leading to a 1934 split, after which de Basil formed an arrangement with financier Sol Hurok. Col. de Basil initially renamed the company Ballets Russes de Colonel W. de Basil.

In 1937, René Blum and former Ballets Russes choreographer Léonide Massine organized a new ballet company and lured away some of de Basil's dancers. In addition, Massine sued de Basil in London to regain the intellectual property rights to his own works. He also sued to claim the Ballet Russe de Monte Carlo name. The jury decided that de Basil owned Massine's ballets created between 1932 and 1937, but not those created before 1932. It also ruled that both successor companies could use the name Ballet Russe — but only Massine & Blum's company could be called Ballet Russe de Monte-Carlo. Col. de Basil renamed his company again, as the Covent Garden Russian Ballet. In 1939, he gave the company its final name, the Original Ballet Russe.

De Basil brought the Original Ballet Russe on a tour of Australia in 1939–1940, travelling there aboard the P&O ocean liner RMS Maloja in September 1938. He had earlier organised tours to Australia in 1936–1937 and 1938–1939, although he did not travel with the company. During his visit to Australia, de Basil commissioned work from Australians, especially from designers, who included Sidney Nolan and Kathleen and Florence Martin. He also instigated a design competition for an original Australian ballet, which was won by Donald Friend with designs for a ballet based on a fictitious event in the life of Ned Kelly.

He directed his Ballet Russe companies, which performed under a variety of different names, until his death in Nice in 1951. All in all, De Basil's troupes presented 40 world premieres, and maintained 100 ballets. They gave performances in 600 cities located in 70 countries around the world. His acquisition of Serge Diaghilev's costumes and sets in 1934 when Massine couldn't come up with the money, helped De Basil's company assume the mantle of leadership in the modern ballet world. He died penniless in a studio apartment with his third wife, Olga Morasova, at his side.

After his death, he joined many of his ballet dancers and comrades in the Sainte-Geneviève-des-Bois Russian Cemetery, Paris.

References

External links
 
 National Gallery of Australia – The de Basil Russian Ballet Company

1888 births
1951 deaths
Ballets Russes and descendants
Ballet impresarios
Businesspeople from Kaunas